{{Infobox album
| name       = Stitt Meets Brother Jack
| type       = Studio
| artist     = Sonny Stitt with Jack McDuff
| cover      = Stitt Meets Brother Jack.jpg
| alt        =
| released   = 1962
| recorded   = February 16, 1962
| venue      =
| studio     = Van Gelder Studio, Englewood Cliffs, New Jersey
| genre      = Jazz
| length     = 38:06
| label      = PrestigePR 7244
| producer   = Esmond Edwards
| chronology = Sonny Stitt
| prev_title = Boss Tenors
| prev_year  = 1961
| next_title = Boss Tenors in Orbit!
| next_year  = 1962
| misc       = 
{{Extra album cover
 | header  = Nother Fu'ther Cover
 | type    = Album
 | cover   = 'Nother Fu'ther.jpg
 | border  =
 | alt     =
 | caption =
}}
}}Stitt Meets Brother Jack (also released as 'Nother Fu'ther''''') is an album by saxophonist Sonny Stitt with organist Jack McDuff recorded in 1962 and released on the Prestige label.

Reception

The Allmusic review by Scott Yanow stated, "a spirited outing... the music always swings in a soulful boppish way. Worth picking up although not essential".

Track listing 
All compositions by Sonny Stitt except where noted.
 "All of Me" (Gerald Marks, Seymour Simons) – 4:50     
 "Pam Ain't Blue" – 4:33     
 "Time After Time" (Sammy Cahn, Jule Styne) – 4:38     
 "Ringin' In" – 5:19     
 "'Nother Fu'ther" – 6:24     
 "When Sonny Gets Blue" (Jack McDuff, Sonny Stitt) – 6:42     
 "Thirty-Three, Ninety Six" – 6:02

Personnel 
Sonny Stitt – tenor saxophone
Jack McDuff – organ
Eddie Diehl – guitar
Art Taylor – drums
Ray Barretto – congas

References 

1962 albums
Sonny Stitt albums
Jack McDuff albums
Prestige Records albums
Albums recorded at Van Gelder Studio
Albums produced by Esmond Edwards